Licking County is a county located in the central portion of the U.S. state of Ohio. At the 2020 census, the population was 178,519. Its county seat is Newark. The county was formed on January 30, 1808, from portions of Fairfield County.

It is named after the Licking River, which is thought to be named for the salt licks that were in the area. However, one account explains it as an English pronunciation of the river's indigenous Delaware name W'li/'ik'/nk, which means "where the flood waters recede".

Licking County is part of the Columbus, OH Metropolitan Statistical Area.

Geography
It is the third-largest county in Ohio by land area.

Adjacent counties
 Knox County (north)
 Coshocton County (northeast)
 Muskingum County (east)
 Perry County (southeast)
 Fairfield County (southwest)
 Franklin County (west)
 Delaware County (northwest)

Major highways

Demographics

2000 census
As of the census of 2000, there were 146,491 people, 55,609 households, and 40,149 families living in the county. The population density was 212 people per square mile (82/km2). There were 58,760 housing units at an average density of 86 per square mile (33/km2).  The racial makeup of the county was 95.64% White, 2.06% Black or African American, 0.30% Native American, 0.58% Asian, 0.02% Pacific Islander, 0.30% from other races, and 1.10% from two or more races. 0.76% of the population were Hispanic or Latino of any race.
Of the 55,609 households 34.40% had children under the age of 18 living with them, 58.50% were married couples living together, 10.00% had a female householder with no husband present, and 27.80% were non-families. 23.10% of households were one person and 9.10% were one person aged 65 or older. The average household size was 2.56 and the average family size was 3.01.

The age distribution was 26.00% under the age of 18, 8.80% from 18 to 24, 29.40% from 25 to 44, 23.90% from 45 to 64, and 11.90% 65 or older. The median age was 37 years. For every 100 females there were 94.80 males. For every 100 females age 18 and over, there were 92.00 males.

The median household income was $44,124 and the median family income  was $51,969. Males had a median income of $37,957 versus $26,884 for females. The per capita income for the county was $20,581. About 5.50% of families and 7.50% of the population were below the poverty line, including 9.10% of those under age 18 and 7.50% of those age 65 or over.

2010 census
As of the census of 2010, there were 166,492 people, 63,989 households, and 45,162 families living in the county. The racial makeup of the county was 93.2% white, 3.4% black or African American, 0.7% Asian, 0.3% American Indian, 0.4% from other races, and 1.9% from two or more races. Those of Hispanic or Latino origin made up 1.4% of the population. In terms of ancestry, 29.5% were German, 16.0% were Irish, 13.0% were English, 10.8% were American, and 5.5% were Italian.

Of the 63,989 households, 34.2% had children under the age of 18 living with them, 54.5% were married couples living together, 11.2% had a female householder with no husband present, 29.4% were non-families, and 23.8% of households were made up of individuals. The average household size was 2.55 and the average family size was 3.00. The median age was 39.1 years.

The median household income was $53,291 and the median family income was $64,386. Males had a median income of $47,391 versus $37,054 for females. The per capita income for the county was $25,534. About 8.2% of families and 11.1% of the population were below the poverty line, including 15.7% of those under age 18 and 6.5% of those age 65 or over.

Politics
Prior to 1944, Licking County primarily supported Democratic Party candidates in presidential elections, only voting for Republican candidates five times from 1856 to 1940 in five national landslides for the party. From 1944 on, the county has become a Republican stronghold presidentially, with the only Democratic presidential candidate to win the county since then being Lyndon B. Johnson in the midst of his 1964 national landslide.

|}

Industry and business
In January 2022 Intel announced their intention to build a $20 billion dollar semiconductor plant in Licking County that would employ up to 3,000 workers. The facility will be built on 3,190 acres site that have been annexed from Jersey township to New Albany.

Places of interest

 Newark Earthworks
 Blackhand Gorge State Nature Preserve
 Flint Ridge State Memorial
 Dawes Arboretum
 Ye Olde Mill in Utica, where Velvet ice cream is produced.
 Heisey Glass Museum
 Longaberger former basket facility (Main office building was a 7-story replica basket, the largest in the world)
 National Trail Raceway - NHRA Dragstrip
 Denison University
 Home Building Association Bank

Sports

Licking County high school athletic programs include Granville High School, Heath High School, Johnstown-Monroe High School, Lakewood High School, Licking Valley High School, Licking Heights High School, Newark Catholic High School, Newark High School, Northridge High School, Utica High School, and Watkins Memorial High School. In baseball, a state title has been won by a Licking County high school team every year since to 2002, when three Licking County teams won state titles. Newark Catholic High School and Heath High School have combined for nine state titles in a six-year span.

Licking County schools won at least one state title in four straight sport seasons: Heath in both baseball and boys track and field (2007), Newark Catholic in football (2007), Newark in boys basketball (2008) and Lakewood in softball (2008).

Communities

Cities
 Heath
 New Albany
 Newark (county seat)
 Pataskala
 Reynoldsburg
 Johnstown

Villages

 Alexandria
 Buckeye Lake
 Granville
 Gratiot
 Hanover
 Hartford
 Hebron
 Kirkersville
 St. Louisville
 Utica

Townships

 Bennington
 Bowling Green
 Burlington
 Eden
 Etna
 Fallsbury
 Franklin
 Granville
 Hanover
 Harrison
 Hartford
 Hopewell
 Jersey
 Liberty
 Licking
 Madison
 Mary Ann
 McKean
 Monroe
 Newark
 Newton
 Perry
 St. Albans
 Union
 Washington

Census-designated places
 Beechwood Trails
 Brownsville
 Etna
 Granville South
 Harbor Hills
 Marne

Unincorporated communities

 Amsterdam
 Appleton
 Ben
 Boston
 Chatham
 Columbia Center
 Fleatown
 Fredonia
 Homer
 Jacksontown
 Jersey
 Linnville
 Lloyd Corners
 Locust Grove
 Luray
 New Way
 Outville
 Perryton
 Rain Rock
 Toboso
 Union Station
 Wagram
 Welsh Hills
 Wilkins Run

See also
 National Register of Historic Places listings in Licking County, Ohio

References

Further reading
 Thomas William Lewis, History of Southeastern Ohio and the Muskingum Valley, 1788-1928. In Three Volumes. Chicago: S.J. Clarke Publishing Co., 1928.

External links
 Licking County Government's website
 Flint Ridge State Memorial

 
Populated places established in 1808
1808 establishments in Ohio